Rucker House may refer to:

in the United States (by state then city)
Rucker House (Bauxite, Arkansas), in Saline County, listed on the National Register of Historic Places (NRHP)
Simeon and Jane Rucker Log House, Alpharetta, Georgia, listed on the National Register of Historic Places in Fulton County, Georgia
Beulah Rucker House-School, Gainesville, Georgia, listed on the National Register of Historic Places in Hall County, Georgia
Rucker House (Ruckersville, Georgia), in Elbert County, NRHP-listed
Benjamine Rucker House, Compton, Rutherford County, Tennessee, NRHP-listed
Rucker-Mason Farm, Porterfield, Tennessee, listed on the NRHP in Cannon County, Tennessee
Marshall-Rucker-Smith House, Charlottesville, Virginia, NRHP-listed
Rucker House (Everett, Washington), in Snohomish County, NRHP-listed